AlltheWeb (sometimes referred to as FAST or FAST Search) was an Internet search engine that made its debut in mid-1999 and was closed in 2011. It grew out of FTP Search, Tor Egge's doctorate thesis at the Norwegian University of Science and Technology, which he started in 1994, which in turn resulted in the formation of Fast Search & Transfer (FAST), established on July 16, 1997.

Traits
When AlltheWeb started in 1999, FAST aimed to provide their database to other search engines, major portals, ISPs and content sites. By August 2, 1999, the AlltheWeb database had grown to 200 million unique URLs. By June 2002, their crawler had indexed over 2 billion pages.

AlltheWeb claimed a few advantages over Google, such as a fresher database, more advanced search features, search clustering and a completely customizable look.

Closure
In February 2003, FAST's web search division was bought by Overture for $70 million. In July 2003, Overture was acquired by Yahoo!, putting AlltheWeb under the ownership of Yahoo!. Shortly after Yahoo!'s acquisition, the AlltheWeb site started using Yahoo!'s database and some of the advanced functions were removed, such as FTP search and direct image search.

In May 2006, Yahoo! started testing live search results on AlltheWeb.

On April 4, 2011, AlltheWeb was shut down by Yahoo!.

See also
List of search engines

References

External links

Alltheweb.es search Engine (archived).

Defunct internet search engines
Discontinued Yahoo! services
Internet properties established in 1999
Internet properties disestablished in 2011
Dot-com bubble
1999 establishments in Norway